Pierre Desrey de Troyes was a French chronicler, historian, genealogist and translator. 
Relatively little is known of his life, but his work is of value to historians.

Life and work

Desrey was born around 1450 and died around 1514.
He was a native of Troyes. His motto was said to be Tout par honneur (All in good faith).
Little is known of his life, but his work indicates that he was well educated and had broad interests.
He was a scholar with deep knowledge of the scriptures, a translator and a compiler of history who drew on various sources.
In his continuation of the Chronicles de Enguerran de Monstrelet, which includes the whole reign of Charles VIII of France, he describes himself as a "simple orateur de Troyes en Champagne."
Since there is no record of his being a member of the clergy, "orateur" may be taken as meaning "prose writer".

Desrey contributed to the Mystère de la Passion de Troyes, and acted in the plays as a member of the Compagnons de Mystère.
According to Théophile Boutiot, Desrey was one of the main actors in 1497, and could be called the principal.
That year he represented the eternal Father. The town gave him 100 sous for his expenses and effort.
His writings include a Latin version of the Danse Macabre (1490), a translation of Nicholas of Lyra's Les Postilles et Expositions des Epistres et Evangilles Dominacales (1493), a translation of Werner Rolevinck's Fasciculus Temporum entitled Fleurs et Manières des Temps Passées (1495), a compilation  (1504), Parement et triumphe des Dames d'Olivier de la Marche (1510) and contributions on Monstrelet (1512) and Gaguin (1514) to the Grandes Chroniques de France.

Desrey is thought to be the author of several poems, and is also thought to be the author of the Troyes Mémoire.
This was apparently written in 1492.
It is a set of instructions for artists making tapestries for the Church of Saint-Urbain, Troyes, that would depict legends of Saint Urban and Saint Cecilia.
They gave a good sense of the details he thought important as an iconographer, but left considerable freedom of expression to the artist.

Desrey's Genealogie de Godefroi de Buillon, completed in 1499, survives only in print.
It gives a complete history of the Crusades, starting with the birth of the Chevalier au Cygne (Knight of the Swan), the mythical ancestor of Godfrey of Bouillon (1060–1100), and ending after the accession of Philip IV of France (1268–1314).
At least six editions are preserved from the 16th century, published between 1504 and 1580.

Surviving publications

Author

Translator

Notes

Sources

1450 births
1514 deaths
15th-century French historians
16th-century French historians
Writers from Troyes

Year of birth uncertain
Year of death uncertain